Gribaumont is a Brussels Metro station on line 1 (prior to 4 April 2009 the eastern branch of line 1B). It is located in the municipality of Woluwe-Saint-Lambert/Sint-Lambrechts-Woluwe, in the eastern part of Brussels, Belgium, and opened on 20 January 1976. It is located under the / and takes its name from the nearby /, named after the landowner who helped develop the area in the 1900s.

In 2008, the original Pavimento Pirelli black rubber floor tiles on the platforms were removed. They were replaced with new biscuit-coloured terrazzo tiles, with darker grey tiles nearest to the walls. The platform area overhead lighting was also replaced in late 2008.

References

Brussels metro stations
Railway stations opened in 1976
Woluwe-Saint-Lambert